= Constituency RSM-166 =

Reserved constituency of the Provincial Assembly of Sindh, Pakistan

RSM-166
- Provincial Reserved constituency for the Provincial Assembly of Sindh

Current constituency

RSM-166 is a reserved Constituency of the Provincial Assembly of Sindh.

== See also ==
- Sindh
